Craspedoplax is a genus of chitons in the family Acanthochitonidae.

 Names brought to synonymy
 Craspedoplax elegans Iredale & Hull, 1925, a synonym for Craspedochiton elegans (Iredale & Hull, 1925)

References

External links 

 
 Craspedoplax at the World Register of Marine Species (WoRMS)

Acanthochitonidae
Chiton genera